Q98 may refer to:

Radio stations 
 CJCQ-FM, in North Battleford, Saskatchewan
 KQWB-FM, in Fargo, North Dakota
 WXXQ, in Rockford, Illinois

Other uses 
 Q98 (New York City bus)
 Al-Bayyina, the 98th surah of the Quran